Pan Am Flight 292 was operated by a Boeing 707-120B that flew into Chances Peak on the island of Montserrat on 17 September 1965 while on a flight from Fort-de-France - Le Lamentin Airport in Martinique to Coolidge International Airport in Antigua and Barbuda. The aircraft was destroyed, there were no survivors among the 30 passengers and crew on board.

Aircraft
The aircraft, bearing the registration N708PA and named Clipper Constitution by its owner Pan American World Airways (Pan Am), was the first Boeing 707 built that had made the first flight of the type on 20 December 1957. It had been used by Boeing on test flights prior to delivery to Pan Am in November the following year.

Crash
The aircraft departed Fort-de-France's Le Lamentin Airport on a scheduled flight to New York City via St. John's, Antigua and Barbuda and San Juan, Puerto Rico. There were 21 passengers and a crew of nine on board. The cause was determined to be pilot error: the crew made a navigational error and descended below the safe minimum altitude while unsure of their position.

References

Dorr, Robert F. Air Force One, MBI Publishing Company, St. Paul Minnesota, 2002. 

 

Accidents and incidents involving the Boeing 707 
Aviation accidents and incidents in 1965
292|Pan Am Flight 0292
Airliner accidents and incidents caused by pilot error
Airliner accidents and incidents involving controlled flight into terrain
1965 in the Caribbean
September 1965 events in North America